The Edmonds Historical Museum is a free museum in Edmonds, Washington, which focuses on Edmonds' history through various exhibits and a small collection of artifacts. It was established in 1973 by the Edmonds-South Snohomish County Historical Society. It is located in downtown Edmonds at 118 5th Ave. North.

Displays
The Edmonds Historical Museum building has two floors. The upper floor features an exhibit gallery which offers temporary rotating displays, a diorama depicting the 1910 Edmonds town site and waterfront, and the Cook Victorian Parlor. The upper level also houses the administrative office, work rooms, a local history library and an extensive photography archive. The research library is open to the public by appointment.

The ground floor consists of the long-term exhibit conceived to commemorate the centennial of the incorporation of the City of Edmonds (1890-1990). The ground floor contains a series of displays depicting Edmonds' past, including some reconstructions of historical locations and objects, such as a room from a local hotel and a model of a shingle mill, representative of the mills that filled the waterfront at the turn of the century.

Events and community outreach
The museum is geared towards the education of local students and residents. The museum created a "Trunk Tales for the Classroom" social studies curriculum for elementary school students. University of Washington students assisted with a 201 photography exhibit.

The Edmonds Historical Museum hosts and participates in several local community events including the Edmonds Historical Walk, the Edmonds Museum Garden Market hosted annually since 1994, and an annual scarecrow festival since 2012.

The museum hosted a talk by Lourdes Alvarado-Ramos about veterans' affairs services in 2019.

The museum has featured local indigenous artwork from Tulalip and Coast Salish artists.

References

External links
 Official website

Museums in Snohomish County, Washington
History museums in Washington (state)
Edmonds, Washington